The Peace Sign or peace symbol is the internationally recognized symbol for peace.

Peace Sign may also refer to:
 V sign, commonly called the peace sign
 Peace Sign (Paul Hyde album) (2009)
 Peace Sign (Richie Kotzen album) (2009)
 Peace Sign (War album) (1994)
 "Peace Sign", a 2015 song by Rick Ross from Black Market
 "Peace Sign", a 2017 single by Kenshi Yonezu